Castlevania: Lords of Shadow – Mirror of Fate is a Nintendo 3DS game in the Castlevania series. It was released in March 2013, and is a direct sequel to  Castlevania: Lords of Shadow, which served as a reboot of the franchise. 

An upgraded version of the game, titled Castlevania: Lords of Shadow – Mirror of Fate HD, was released digitally for Xbox 360, PlayStation 3, and Windows.

Gameplay
The player assumes the role of Gabriel Belmont, his son Trevor Belmont, grandson Simon Belmont (Trevor's son), and Alucard.
Mirror of Fate is a side-scrolling action-adventure game. It returns to the classic Castlevania gameplay viewed in the main series.

Plot
Prologue

Prior to the events of the previous game, Gabriel Belmont (voiced by Robert Carlyle) makes love to his wife Marie before accompanying four Order knights on a mission to slay a Lycan. While he is gone, Marie gives birth while surrounded by Pan and the heads of the Order. She names the baby Trevor before the Order takes him away due to fear of an omimous procephy.

Simon's Story

An untold period of time later, Simon Belmont (voiced by Alec Newman), Trevor's son, witnesses his mother's murder at the hands of Dracula's forces. He pledges her vengeance before fleeing to the mountains. The Mountain People raise him as a fighter and he becomes a master at the whip. Upon reaching adulthood, Simon leaves the mountains to go to Castlevania, Dracula's castle. Upon arriving he meets a shade (voiced by Michael Maloney), who requests his medallion. He refuses and The Shade directs him to obtain a copy of The Combat Cross (The original destroyed by Gabriel in the first game) which allows him to swing across large gaps. He enters the theatre but is trapped and ambushed by an endless stream of Evil Puppets who fight him. Just as he is about to be cutdown, a White Haired Man saves him and ends the stream of puppets. The White Haired Man flees before Simon can confront him.

The White Haired Man saves Simon once more by stopping a dangerous carousel. He reveals that he knows Simon before fleeing once more.

Simon finally recovers the Combat Cross but is attacked by a Necromancer who believes Zobek (The main antagonist of the previous game) is still alive. The Necromancer takes the Combat Cross to give to the dead Zobek. After a long battle, Simon slays The Necromancer and takes The Combat Cross. He journeys up the Tower and slays Dracula's lover, The Succubus (voiced by Elanor Howell) . He enters the throne room and confronts Dracula, but the White Haired Man enters and reveals himself to be Alucard.

Alucard's Story

Alucard (voiced by Richard Madden) awakens from a tomb with his name engraved upon it in gold lettering. He views a gigantic mirror and The Shade from before. The Shade shows him that he is now a vampire, turned by Dracula. Alucard, suffering from amnesia, believes that his fate is to slay Dracula. Alucard journeys through the Castle and encounters The Daemon Lord Rebuilt (voiced by Richard Ridings), a cyborg Chimaera who hates Alucard. The Daemon Lord easily defeats the weakened Alucard and burns him in the sunlight before dropping him off the tower. Alucard is barely saved by dropping into a pool of water (created by Simon solving a puzzle earlier) that extinguishes him.

Alucard journeys back up the tower and saves Simon twice, once from deadly puppets and the second time from a spinning carousel. Dracula witnesses this both times. After gaining more strength and powers (A bat form and a wolf form) Alucard slays The Daemon Lord and enters the throne room. He encounters Simon and Dracula. Simon and Alucard fight Dracula and seem to be winning. However, Dracula infects Simon with darkness and he turns on Alucard. Alucard cures Simon and the two defeat The Dark Lord. Alucard restrains Dracula and exclaims that Simon must deal the killing blow. Simon does and Dracula dissolves. Alucard muses on the way Dracula died means that Dracula probably isn't fully dead and tells Simon that The Shade wants Simon's necklace, "as it didn't belong to your father and it doesn't belong to you." The Necklace is revealed to be a shard of the mirror, Now revealed to be The Mirror Of Fate, and has been manipulating the Belmonts. Simon once more asks Alucard's true identity but Alucard leaves without words.

Trevor's Story

Raised in secret by The Order, Trevor Belmont learns that he is Dracula's son. He tells his wife that he is to journey to Castlevania and avenge his mother Marie (killed by Gabriel in the previous game. Unbeknownest to Trevor, Gabriel was controlled by Zobek to kill her). He bids his wife and his son, Simon, farewell before giving the young Simon his medallion, a gift from The Order. Upon arriving at the castle, The Shade tells Trevor that he will die before he kills Dracula and in a rage, Trevor breaks the Shade's face, rendering it mute. On the bridge to the castle, a massive beast restrained by the servants of the castle breaks free and smashes the bridge casting Trevor into the caves below. While there, Trevor confronts a weeping woman, rumored to be a victim of Dracula who lost her lover. She is revealed to be a lure for a massive beast who eats Trevor's Combat Cross. Trevor wrangles it and slays it, recovering his cross.

Trevor obtains the medallions of fallen Order Knights and learns Light and Dark magic. Upon reaching the Tower's belfry, the Bell falls and Trevor narrowly avoids being crushed by it. He meets a group of witches who unleash The Daemon Lord. After pursuing it throughout the castle, Trevor bisects and dismembers it. Believing it to be dead, he leaves to the Throne Room. The Toy Maker, the creator of the puppets, cackles gleefully as he gets to work on the corpse of The Daemon Lord.

Confronting Dracula, Trevor swears to kill Dracula and avenge his mother. Dracula declares that he does not care about his victims and the two fight. Trevor uses Light and Dark magic to counteract Dracula's powers and the two fight high above the castle. Trevor gains the upper hand and cuts off Dracula's hands before the two plummet to the ground. Trevor plunges the Combat Cross into Dracula as the two hit the ground.

Dracula is revealed to be fine as Trevor has been impaled with the Cross. Dracula gloats as Trevor reveals that he is his son. Dracula calls him a liar but Trevor directs him to the mirror. Dracula, driven mad with grief, refuses to let his son die. He attempts to turn him into a vampire, but Trevor is already dead. Dracula places The Combat Cross into a plaque (where Simon finds it) and builds Trevor a coffin. He engraves the coffin with "Alucard," to protect Trevor's identity.

Epilogue

After Dracula's death, Alucard searches the castle for the stake that broke off The Combat Cross in the previous game. Upon finding it, he flees the castle. Simon watches the castle collapse and says farewell to the mysterious Alucard.

Development
Mirror of Fate was announced in May 2012, for the Nintendo 3DS as a side-scrolling action-adventure game. It was released on March 5, 2013, in North America and March 8, 2013, in Europe. Mirror of Fate was delayed because MercurySteam was not pleased with certain elements of it.

According to the producer David Cox, the development team had originally developed Mirror of Fate in HD, and adapted it later for the 3DS. The HD version of the game was released as a digital download on October 25, 2013, for Xbox 360 via Xbox Live Arcade, on October 29, 2013, for PlayStation 3 via PlayStation Network, and on March 27, 2014, for Windows through Steam.

Reception

The game has received mixed reviews, with a 72/100 on aggregate score site Metacritic for the Nintendo 3DS. Peter Brown of GameSpot gave the game a 7 out of 10, praising the visuals and the combat system, while criticizing the game's easy difficulty and predictable story. IGN Colin Moriarty panned the game with a score of 4.7 out of 10, concluding that it had "emphasis on fragmented exploration and shallow leveling".

Notes

References

External links
 

2013 video games
2010s horror video games
Action-adventure games
Lords of Shadow - Mirror of Fate
Dark fantasy video games
Filicide in fiction
Interquel video games
Nintendo 3DS games
Nintendo 3DS eShop games
Patricide in fiction
PlayStation 3 games
PlayStation Network games
Side-scrolling platform games
Side-scrolling role-playing video games
Side-scrolling video games
Video games developed in Spain
Video game prequels
Video game sequels
Video games with 2.5D graphics
Windows games
Xbox 360 games
Xbox 360 Live Arcade games
Metroidvania games
Gargoyles in popular culture
Single-player video games